Autotrain or Auto train may refer to:

 Autotrain, a type of push-pull train incorporating a steam locomotive and specially fitted passenger coaches
 Auto Train, a specific Amtrak passenger service
 Auto-Train Corporation
 Motorail, a passenger train service that incorporates the carriage of automobiles